Bror Sixten Korkman (born 3 February 1948 in Vaasa) is a Finnish doctor of political science, an economist, former CEO of the Elinkeinoelämän tutkimuslaitos and a guest on the show Daniel Olin.

Personal life
He was once married to Marit Korkman from an unknown year to 2012. He has one child with her, Julia Korkman.

Filmography 
 Väärää politiikkaa (1994)
 Harmaa eminenssi (2013)
 Politiikka-Suomi (2021)

Books
Economic Policy in the European Union (published November 10, 2004)

External links
https://teknologiateollisuus.fi/sites/default/files/file_attachments/visio_3_05lr.pdf
https://www.amazon.com/Sixten-Korkman/e/B001JXB8QW
https://books.google.ca/books/about/Economic_Policy_in_the_European_Union.html?id=05dwQgAACAAJ&source=kp

References

1948 births
Living people